Gazdan-e Abbas Abdollah (also Romanized as Gazdān-e ‘Abbās ‘Abdollāh; also known as Gazdān-e Sheykh, Gazdān Sheykh, and Gezdān Sheykh) is a village in Sigar Rural District, in the Central District of Lamerd County, Fars Province, Iran. At the 2006 census, its population was 117, in 21 families.

References 

Populated places in Lamerd County